Elections to the European Parliament took place in Slovakia on 24 May 2014. It was the third European election which took place in Slovakia.

Thirteen MEPs were elected from Slovakia using a proportional list system joining the other candidates elected as part of the wider 2014 European Parliament election

The 'faster processing of interim results' was promised by the Slovak Office for Statistics because of a new electronic counting system.

Turnout, at 13% of registered voters, was the lowest across the EU.

Main contesting parties

Results

Elected deputies
Winning party left-wing populist Smer-SD won 4 seats (Monika Beňová, Vladimír Maňka, Monika Smolková, Boris Zala, leader of Smer-SD in this election - Maroš Šefčovič became again European commissioner from Slovakia), Christian democratic KDH with 2 seats (Anna Záborská, Miroslav Mikolášik ), also liberal conservatives from SDKÚ-DS had 2 seats (Eduard Kukan, Ivan Štefanec), and 1 seats won conservative coalition NOVA-KDS-OKS (Jana Žitňanská, leader of united list of conservatives was Jozef Kollár but he wasn't elect), populist OĽaNO (Branislav Škripek, leader of list OĽaNO was Jozef Viskupič but he wasn't elect), liberal SaS (Richard Sulík, Ján Oravec as leader of list SaS wasn't elect), Hungarian minority conservative party SMK-MKP (Pál Csáky) and also Hungarian minority but more liberal and anti-Orbán party Most-Híd (József Nagy, Zsolt Simon as leader wasn't elect).

By European parliamentary group:

References

External links

Slovakia
European Parliament elections in Slovakia
2014 in Slovakia